Julia Schramm (born 30 September 1985, in Frankfurt am Main) is a German politician and publicist. From April to October 2012, she was a member of the federal executive of the Pirate Party. She left the party in 2014 and joined the Left in 2016.

Her book Click Me, along with her (or her publisher's) pursuit of illegally distributed copies of the book, has caused controversy in Germany. In 2016 she published a book on Angela Merkel called Fifty Shades of Merkel.

References

1985 births
German bloggers
21st-century German women writers
Pirate Party Germany politicians
Living people
21st-century German women politicians
German women bloggers